Ligabue is a 1978 Italian biographical drama film directed by Salvatore Nocita. It depicts real life events of painter Antonio Ligabue. It is based on a book by Cesare Zavattini. For this film Nocita was awarded Nastro d'Argento for Best New Director, while Flavio Bucci won the Nastro d'Argento for Best Actor.

Cast 
Flavio Bucci: Antonio Ligabue
Andréa Ferréol: Cesarina
Pamela Villoresi: Pia
Giuseppe Pambieri: Mazzacurati
Alessandro Haber: Cachi
Renzo Palmer: Sindaco

References

External links

1978 films
1970s biographical drama films
Biographical films about painters
Italian biographical drama films
Films directed by Salvatore Nocita
1978 directorial debut films
1978 drama films
1970s Italian films
Cultural depictions of Italian men
Cultural depictions of 20th-century painters
Films based on works by Cesare Zavattini